Woodford is a hamlet in northeast Cornwall, England, United Kingdom. It is located southeast of Morwenstow, northwest of Kilkhampton and north of Flexbury. It contains the Woodford Methodist Church.

Woodford lies within the Cornwall Area of Outstanding Natural Beauty (AONB).

References

Hamlets in Cornwall
Morwenstow